Knightswood Secondary School is a secondary school located in Knightswood in the west-end of Glasgow, Scotland.

The school is one of the city's largest secondaries with a roll of approximately 1200 pupils. Knightswood is co-educational, non-selective and non-denominational, and provides education for pupils of varying backgrounds. Knightswood also contains The Dance School Of Scotland, which opened in 1984.

Management

As well as a headteacher and deputy headteacher, each school year has an assistant head teacher, who is able to have a more personal contact with students. The offices of the headteacher, deputy head and assistant heads are all held in one corridor located on the ground floor.

Guidance (known as pastoral care) teachers are assigned by registration classes. There are typically twelve guidance counsellors in one school year.

Classes and timings

Classes previously consisted of 7 periods lasting 50 minutes on Monday only and 6 periods also lasting 50 minutes on Tuesdays to Fridays, with a 20-minute student tutor time.

School timings were changed at the beginning of the 20/21 year to make space for more periods per week. The current timings are as follows. The first class of the day begins at 8:45 AM. There is currently a staggered lunchtime due to COVID-19 restrictions. The lunchtimes of pupils in the S1-6 age groups are currently from 1:10 PM–1:50 PM on Monday-Wednesday and 12:20 PM–1:00 PM on Thursday and Friday.  Ending times have also been changed to 3:30 PM on Monday-Wednesday and 2:40 PM on Thursday and Friday for all pupils. 

Most subjects have classes in the size of twenty to thirty pupils. Classes will be named by year and a set number (i.e. 1R3, 3R4, 2R12) The order of classes does not bear any relation to the skill of the pupils in those groups. In fifth and sixth year, due to subject choices, classes change with every period, and naming them is not necessary.

Layout and structure
Knightswood was the first school designed by the modernist architects Gillespie, Kidd & Coia. Designed in 1938, it was not built until the 1950s, being opened on 10 October 1958 by John Maclay, Secretary of State for Scotland. It is now protected as a category B listed building. Knightswood contains four floors, as well as three annexes.

History
Modern Studies

 The crush hall is a social area containing students' lockers. It is given its name for the "crush" of students it is able to contain during rain or other conditions that would cause students to be unable to remain outside during breaks.

 The drama studio, with separate performance and audience areas, extends to two floors.

 The dance department provides dance instruction for mainstream students, and not students of the dance school of Scotland.

 Home economics covers the subjects of food and textile technology.

 Modern studies is most closely compared to politics, or recent history.

The Dance School of Scotland 
Knightswood Secondary is affiliated with The Dance School of Scotland, a centre of excellence for vocational dance and musical theatre fully funded by the Scottish Government. It's incorporated into the main school to allow Dance and Musical Theatre pupils to have both their academic and vocational needs fulfilled.

Potential pupils audition in the spring/summer and start classes the following school year, if they receive a placement. The Dance course can be auditioned for from S1 and upward. The Preparatory Theatre course for musical theatre can be auditioned for in preparation for S3, and the Musical Theatre for S5/S6. Students are assessed throughout the year and progression through the school is dependent on their assessment grades.

Pupils go to the main building for academic lessons and have class with mainstream students. For subjects deemed not entirely necessary to their education, they return to the dance school and receive vocational training instead. Students in the Dance course study modern, jazz, national, tap and contemporary, with a primary focus on ballet. Musical Theatre and Preparatory Theatre receive tuition in dancing, singing, acting, and performance skills. The Musical Theatre Showcase is performed in November and a fully staged musical is performed (usually at The Citizen's Theatre, Glasgow) in June. The Dance Course's Showcase is performed in June (usually at The Theatre Royal, The King's Theatre or The Glasgow Royal Concert Hall)

If accepted pupils live too far away to travel from home on a daily basis, they can be offered a place at the school's nearby residential building to stay in during the week. Students stay in the residence from Sunday to Thursday inclusive. The residence is shared with students from the Music School of Douglas Academy.

An Open Day for the Dance School School of Scotland is usually held in November.

Notable alumni

Botti Biabi, football player
 John Fleck, football player
 Jamie Murphy, football player
Alan Rough, football goalkeeper
William Sweeney, composer
 Sharon Rooney, actress
 Bill Forsyth, director
 Eubha Akilade, actress and dancer
Mirren Mack, actress
Gary Maclean, chef

References

External links
Knightswood Secondary School official page
Dance School of Scotland official page

Category B listed buildings in Glasgow
Listed schools in Scotland
Secondary schools in Glasgow